The Eddie Cantor Story is a 1953 American musical drama film directed by Alfred E. Green and starring Keefe Brasselle, Marilyn Erskine and Aline MacMahon. It is a biopic based on the life of Eddie Cantor featuring Brasselle as Cantor. It was produced and distributed by Warner Brothers. Cantor himself appeared briefly in the film in a cameo role.

Plot
Raised by his grandmother on New York's East Side, 13-year-old Eddie sings while another neighborhood kid, Rocky Kramer, and his gang pick pockets. Eddie is sent by Grandma Esther to a boys' camp, where he entertains the others with his songs and routines.

Ida Tobias, daughter of a local merchant, elopes with Eddie a few years later. Rocky is now a local politician and gets Eddie a job in a nightclub. Eddie tells the family he's the star performer there, but he's actually a singing waiter. But piano player Jimmy Durante helps land him a job in a California show.

A headline performer envious of Eddie's popularity pulls a prank, telling him Flo Ziegfeld wants him for the Follies show in New York. It turns out Ziegfeld has never heard of Eddie when he arrives at the theater, but an audition by Eddie is so good, Ziegfeld does indeed hire him.

Ida gives birth to several children while Eddie becomes a big success. She's upset that his family doesn't seem to come first, and matters are complicated when Eddie's fortune is lost in the 1929 stock-market crash. A heart attack slows Eddie, as well, but he prospers on the radio as his health improves, and soon he is happy at work and at home.

Cast

 Keefe Brasselle as Eddie Cantor
 Marilyn Erskine as Ida
 Aline MacMahon as Grandma Esther
 Gerald Mohr as Rocky
 Arthur Franz as Harry Harris
 Alex Gerry as 	David Tobias
 Greta Granstedt as Rachel Tobias
 Jackie Barnett as Jimmy Durante
Dick Monda as Eddie Cantor 	Eddie - aged 13
 Marie Windsor as	Cleo Abbott
 Douglas Evans as 	Leo Raymond
 Ann Doran as 	Lillian Edwards
 Hal March as 	Gus Edwards
 Susan Odin as 	Ida - age 11
 Owen Pritchard as 	Harry Harris - as a Boy
 Will Rogers Jr. as	Will Rogers
 William Forrest as Flo Ziegfeld
 Nedrick Young as 	Jack 
 James Craven as	Bert Glenville
 Kathleen Case as Francey 
 Chick Chandler as 	Lesser 
 Kermit Maynard as 	Willie 
 James Flavin as 	Kelly - Policeman
 Julie Newmar as Showgirl 
 Barbara Pepper as 	Patron 
 Eddie Cantor as Audience Member

Production
The film was announced in 1948 with a budget of $3 million.

References

External links

The Eddie Cantor Story at TCM Database

1953 films
1950s biographical films
1953 musical films
American biographical films
American musical films
Biographical films about entertainers
Films about musical theatre
Films directed by Alfred E. Green
Warner Bros. films
Films set in 1905
Films set in the 1920s
1950s English-language films
1950s American films